Glacken (or Glackens) is a surname. Notable people with the surname include:

 Clarence Glacken
 Louis Glackens, American illustrator and cartoonist L. M. Glackens
 Scotty Glacken, American football player and coach
 William Glackens

See also
 Smoke Glacken, a racehorse